Riodocea is a genus of plants in the family Rubiaceae. It includes only one known species, Riodocea pulcherrima, indigenous to the Espírito Santo region of Brazil.

References 

Monotypic Rubiaceae genera
Cordiereae